Fitch House may refer to:

in the United States
(by state then town)
Fitch House (Tuscaloosa, Alabama), listed on the NRHP in Tuscaloosa County
Sloan-Raymond-Fitch House, Wilton, Connecticut, listed on the NRHP in Fairfield County
Fitch's General Store and House, East Sebago, Maine, listed on the NRHP in Cumberland County
Peabody-Fitch House, South Bridgton, Maine, listed on the NRHP in Cumberland County
C.H. Fitch House, Worcester, Massachusetts, listed on the NRHP in Worcester County, Massachusetts
Fitch Hall, Socorro, New Mexico, listed on the NRHP in Socorro County
James Gurden Fitch House, Socorro, New Mexico, listed on the NRHP in Socorro County
Charles C. Fitch Farmstead, Eugene, Oregon, listed on the NRHP in Lane County

See also
Fitch Terrace, Pueblo, Colorado, listed on the NRHP in Pueblo County, Colorado